Penny Mallory is an English keynote speaker and performance coach, and a former British Rally Championship driver.

She is a Leading Authority on Mental Toughness.
She became the first woman to drive a World Rally Car (WRC)-specification in the otherwise male-dominated FIA World Rally Championship. Penny has been a boxer, mountaineer, marathon runner and triathlete. 

She also worked as a precision stunt driver, playing both 'Nicole' and 'Papa', for two Renault Clio commercials.

Mallory is also a former television presenter; she co-hosted Channel 4's motoring programme Driven alongside Mike Brewer and Jason Plato, and Accident Black Spot.  She also co-hosted with Jason Dawe on the Used Car Roadshow, which was originally broadcast on Men & Motors, now occasionally repeated on ITV4.  She presented Classic Car Club for Discovery with Edd China, Tony Mason and Alex Riley.  She also previously co-presented Channel 4's programme on the World Rally Championship (WRC) series, until it was taken over by ITV in 2004.

Publications
Books

DVDs

References

External links
PennyMallory.co.uk — Penny Mallory's official website

Living people
English racing drivers
English female racing drivers
English rally drivers
British television presenters
British women television presenters
Spokespersons
English motivational speakers
Year of birth missing (living people)